Zvenyika Makonese (born 7 July 1977 in Chiredzi) is a Zimbabwean footballer. He joined Cape Town-based Santos in 2004 from Zimbabwean club Shabanie Mine. He plays as a defender and was selected for the 2006 African Cup of Nations.

It was reported that he was set to join Stoke City at the end of the 2006–07 season after impressing in a trial at the club, despite interest from Wigan Athletic and several French clubs. However, no such move transpired. He also had an unsuccessful trial at Ligue 1 side Stade Rennes.

On 2 August 2011 Makonese marked his return to the domestic Premiership yesterday when he signed a deal to join Shabanie Mine.
.

He was signed with Black-Leopards in Petersburg, but was unable to play in the PSL because of a lack of documents December 2011 to March 2012.

External links

1977 births
Living people
Zimbabwean footballers
Zimbabwe international footballers
2006 Africa Cup of Nations players
Association football defenders
Zimbabwean expatriates in South Africa
Santos F.C. (South Africa) players
Orlando Pirates F.C. players
Expatriate soccer players in South Africa